Nguyễn Thị Huyền (born 1985 in Hải Phòng) was crowned the 9th Miss Vietnam in 2004. At the time she was a student at the Hanoi Press College. She was the second Miss Vietnam to enter the Miss World competition in 2004. She was one of the 15 semi-finalists in the competition. She is pursuing her bachelor of arts (Journalism) at Middlesex University, in London, concentrating in press-branch. 
She got married on 27 May 2007 and had her first born in December 2007 named Tong Khanh Linh. Her husband's name is Tống Ngọc Trung.

Miss Viet Nam 2004 
 The winner : Nguyễn Thị Huyền (Hải Phòng)
1st runner up :Trịnh Chân Trân (Ho Chi Minh City)
2nd runner up : Nguyễn Thị Ngọc Bích (Bến Tre)
Finalists: Nguyễn Thảo Hương (Hà Nội), Nguyễn Thị Lan Hương (Hà Nội).
Semifinalists: Thân Thị Hoàng Diệu (Tiền Giang), Hồ Thị Quỳnh Nga (Phú Thọ), Trần Thị Thu Hằng (Saigon), Trần Thị Thanh Thủy (Saigon), Phạm Kim Hoàng Yến (Tiền Giang)

Career
- From 2000 to 2003: Nguyen Thi Huyen studied at Thai Phien high school in Hai Phong city.

- 2000: Nguyen Thi Huyen won the first runner-up of Miss Sport Vietnam held in Vung Tau city.

- From 2004 to 2005: Nguyen Thi Huyen pass the examination and the Institute of propaganda newspapers (now called the "Academy of Journalism and Communication")

+ In Oct, 2004, she won the title of Miss Vietnam, and win the best skin award in this competition.

+ In Dec, 2004, Nguyen Thi Huyen participate Miss World (Miss World) in Sanya, China, and has entered the list of 15 most beautiful Miss World (15th top) - Miss you on hosts before - China.

- 2005: Nguyen Thi Huyen retain their learning outcomes in Sub-Institute of journalism and propaganda and in May she left Vietnam to UK bachelor of Journalism at the University of Middlesex, London .

- 2009: Nguyen Thi Huyen bachelor's degree in journalism with honors in Middlesex, London, UK. Then she and her daughter returned to Vietnam to live so far.

- From 2009 to 2011: Nguyen Thi Huyen had been worked in VTV4 - International Television of Vietnam Television Station  - Vietnam Television. Here she participate to contribute the charity TV program called "Life is Beautiful" for disabilities, its weekly broadcast on VTV4. During this time, she also played as the role of MC in both Vietnamese and English for many shows including domestic and foreign.

- From 2011–present: Nguyen Thi Huyen terminate the employment contract at VTV4, do not participate in the MC role, not to participate and answer press on the media. She focused business and open her own Communication company called "NTH Communication".

- From 2012–present: Nguyen Thi Huyen currently PhD student at the Academy of Journalism and Communication.

- From 2013–present: She also works as the role of researcher at the Institute of Communications Research - Academy of Journalism and Communication.

References

External links
Miss Vietnam official website
Miss World 2004

1985 births
Living people
People from Haiphong
Miss Vietnam winners
Miss World 2004 delegates
2004 in Vietnam